Evgeni Aleksandrov (born 14 June 1988) is a Bulgarian footballer who plays as a goalkeeper.

Career
A Litex Lovech youth graduate, Aleksandrov was promoted to the senior squad for 2007–08 season as a third-choice goalkeeper. He made his debut on 28 May 2011, in the last game of the 2010–11 season in a 0–0 home draw against Kaliakra Kavarna.

On 30 July 2011, Aleksandrov played for Litex in the 2011 Bulgarian Supercup match against CSKA Sofia which was lost 2–1. In the 2011–12 season he earned 6 league appearances and kept two clean sheets. He became a starter for Litex during the 2013–14 season after first choice goalkeeper Ilko Pirgov had sustained an injury. Aleksandrov subsequently lost his status as first choice goalkeeper following the arrival of Vinícius Barrivieira prior to the 2014–15 season.

On 28 December 2016, Aleksandrov signed with Montana for 6 months plus another year as club's option. On 29 December 2017, his contract was terminated by mutual consent.

Honours

Club
Litex Lovech
 A PFG (2): 2009–10, 2010–11
 Bulgarian Cup (2): 2007–08, 2008–09
 Bulgarian Supercup: 2010

References

External links

1988 births
Living people
Bulgarian footballers
First Professional Football League (Bulgaria) players
Second Professional Football League (Bulgaria) players
PFC Litex Lovech players
FC Dunav Ruse players
FC Montana players
FC Lokomotiv Gorna Oryahovitsa players
Association football goalkeepers